Christianity in Lebanon has a long and continuous history. Biblical Scriptures purport that Peter and Paul evangelized the Phoenicians, whom they affiliated to the ancient patriarchate of Antioch. The spread of Christianity in Lebanon was very slow where paganism persisted especially in the mountaintop strongholds of Mount Lebanon. A 2015 study estimates some 2,500 Lebanese Christians have Muslim ancestry, whereas the majority of Lebanese Christians are direct descendants of the original early Christians.

The Maronite Catholics and the Druze founded modern Lebanon in the early eighteenth century, through a governing and social system known as the "Maronite-Druze dualism" in the Mount Lebanon Mutasarrifate. Proportionally, Lebanon has the highest rate of Christians in the Middle East, where the percentage ranges between 34% and 40%, followed directly by Egypt and Syria at roughly 10%, and Jordan at 3 to 6%.

History

Before the Christian faith reached the territory of Lebanon, Jesus had traveled to its southern parts near Tyre where the scripture tells that he cured a possessed Canaanite child. Christianity in Lebanon is almost as old as gentile Christian faith itself. Early reports relate the possibility that Saint Peter himself was the one who evangelized the Phoenicians whom he affiliated to the ancient patriarchate of Antioch. Paul also preached in Lebanon, having lingered with the early Christians in Tyre and Sidon. Even though Christianity was introduced to Lebanon after the first century AD, its spread was very slow, particularly in the mountainous areas where paganism was still unyielding.

The earliest indisputable tradition of Christianity in Lebanon can be traced back to Saint Maron in the 4th century AD, being of Greek/Eastern/Antiochian Orthodox origin and the founder of national and ecclesiastical Maronitism. Saint Maron adopted an ascetic and reclusive life on the banks of the Orontes river in the vicinity of Homs–Syria and founded a community of monks which began to preach the gospel in the surrounding areas. By faith, liturgy, rite, religious books and heritage, the Maronites were of Eastern origin. The Saint Maron Monastery was too close to Antioch to grant the monks their freedom and autonomy, which prompted Saint John Maron, the first Maronite patriarch-elect, to lead his monks into the Lebanese mountains to escape emperor Justinian II's persecution, finally settling in the Qadisha valley. Nevertheless, the influence of the Maronite establishment spread throughout the Lebanese mountains and became a considerable feudal force. The existence of the Maronites was largely ignored by the western world until the Crusades. In the 16th century, the Maronite Church adopted the catechism of the Catholic Church and reaffirmed its relationship with it. Moreover, Rome dispatched Franciscan, Dominican and later Jesuit missionaries to Lebanon to Latinise the Maronites.

The relationship between the Druze and Christians has been characterized by harmony and peaceful coexistence, with amicable relations between the two groups prevailing throughout history, with the exception of some periods, including 1860 Mount Lebanon civil war. 

Due to their turbulent history, the Maronites formed a secluded identity in the mountains and valleys of Lebanon, led by the Maronite patriarch who voiced his opinion on contemporary issues. They identify themselves as a unique community whose religion and culture is distinct from the predominantly Muslim Arab world. The Maronites played a major part in the definition of and the creation of the state of Lebanon. The modern state of Greater Lebanon was established by France in 1920 after the instigation of ambitious Maronite leaders headed by patriarch Elias Peter Hoayek, who presided over delegations to France following World War I and requested the re-establishment of the entity of the Principality of Lebanon (1515AD–1840AD). With the creation of the state of Lebanon, Arabism was overcome by Lebanism, which emphasizes Lebanon's Mediterranean and Phoenician heritage. In the National Pact, an unwritten gentleman's agreement between the Maronite President Bshara el-Khoury and Sunni Prime Minister Riad as-Solh, the seats of presidency were distributed between the main Lebanese religious denominations. According to the pact, the President of the Lebanese republic shall always be a Maronite. Furthermore, the pact also states that Lebanon is a state with an "Arab face" (not an Arab identity).

Demographics

Note that the following percentages are estimates only. However, in a country that had its last census in 1932, it is difficult to have correct population estimates.

The number of Christians in Lebanon has been disputed for many years. There has been no official census in Lebanon since 1932. Christians were still half the country by mid-century, but by 1985, only a quarter of all Lebanese were Christians. Many argue over the percentage and population of Christians in Lebanon. One estimate of the Christian share of Lebanon's population as of 2012 is 40.5%. And more recently, in 2018 the CIA World Factbook estimated that Christians constitute 33.7% of Lebanon's population. Therefore, the country has the largest percentage of Christians of all the Middle Eastern nations.

The Maronite Church, an Eastern Catholic church in full communion with the Catholic Church, is the largest and politically most active and influential denomination of Lebanon's Christians. The Catholic Church also includes other Eastern Catholic churches, such as the Melkite Catholic Church. The Eastern Orthodox Church forms the second largest proportion of Lebanese Christians. The Armenian Apostolic Church also forms a large portion of the Christian population in Lebanon.

The other six smaller Christian sects are considered ethnic Assyrians; (Syriac Orthodox, Syriac Catholics, Assyrian Church of the East and Chaldean Catholics)

In the Lebanese Parliament, Lebanese Christians hold 64 seats in tandem with 64 seats for Lebanese Muslims. The Maronites holds 34 seats, the Eastern Orthodox 14, Melkite 8, the  Armenians Apostolics 5, Catholic Armenians 1, Protestants 1, and other Christian minority groups, 1.

Churches and monasteries in Lebanon

The head of the Maronite Church is the Maronite Patriarch of Antioch, who is elected by the bishops of the Maronite church and now resides in Bkerké, north of Beirut (but in the northern town of Dimane during the summer months). The current Patriarch (from 2011) is Mar Bechara Boutros al-Rahi. When a new patriarch is elected and enthroned, he requests ecclesiastic communion from the Pope, thus maintaining the Catholic Church communion. Patriarchs may also be accorded the status of cardinals, in the rank of cardinal-bishops. They share with other Catholics the same doctrine, but Maronites retain their liturgy and hierarchy. Strictly speaking, the Maronite church belongs to the Antiochene Tradition and is a West Syro-Antiochene Rite. Syriac is the liturgical language, instead of Latin. Nevertheless, they are considered, by the Syro-Malabar Church, to be among the most Latinized of the Eastern Catholic Churches.

The Seat of the Maronite Catholic Church is in Bkerké. Monasteries in Lebanon are run by both the Maronite and Orthodox Church. The Holy Monastery of Saint George in Deir El Harf and Saint John the Baptist Monastery in Douma both date back to the 5th century. The Balamand Monastery in Tripoli is a very prominent Orthodox monastery that has a seminary and a university associated with it.

Current political and religious issues

As of May 2022, the Lebanese Forces is the biggest Christian political party in Lebanon.

Under the terms of an agreement known as the National Pact between the various political and religious leaders of Lebanon, the president of the country must be a Maronite, the Prime Minister must be a Sunnite, and the Speaker of Parliament must be a Shiite.

The Taif Agreement helped establish a power-sharing system between the Christian and Muslim Lebanese political parties. The political and economic situation in Lebanon had improved greatly. Lebanon had rebuilt its infrastructure. Historical and contemporary conflicts between Hezbollah and Israel have threatened to deteriorate Lebanon's political and economic situation, with growing tension between the 8 March and 14 March alliances and threatening Lebanon with renewed strife. The Christian community is currently divided, with some aligned with the Kataeb party, Michel Aoun's Free Patriotic Movement, the El Marada Party headed by Suleiman Frangieh, Jr., the Lebanese Forces Movement Samir Geagea, and others within the collection of various 14 March Christian leaders. Although the Taif agreement was widely considered by Christians to degrade their role in Lebanon, by removing much of the President's role (which is allocated to the Maronites), and bolstering the roles of the Prime Minister (a Sunni) and the Speaker of Parliament (Shia), the Lebanese President nevertheless still wields considerable power. The constitutional remit of the president includes the role of Commander in Chief of the armed forces, as well as the sole ability to form and dissolve governments. Many Lebanese leaders, as well as global powers, continue to lobby to roll back features of the Taif Agreement that eroded the constitutional powers of the president of the republic. The role of president of the Lebanese Central bank is also a position reserved for Lebanese Christians. This is due to the historical and contemporary influence of Lebanese Christians among the key bankers of the Middle East region.

Although Lebanon is a secular country, family matters such as marriage, divorce, and inheritance are still handled by the religious authorities representing a person's faith. Calls for civil marriage are unanimously rejected by the religious authorities but civil marriages conducted in another country are recognized by Lebanese civil authorities.

Non-religion is not recognized by the state. But the Minister of the Interior Ziad Baroud made it possible in 2009 to have religious affiliation removed from the Lebanese identity card. This does not, however, deny the religious authorities' complete control over civil family issues inside the country.

In a 1976 diplomatic cable released by WikiLeaks, a US diplomat stated "if I got nothing else from my meeting with Frangie, Chamoun and Gemayel, it is their clear, unequivocal and unmistakable belief that their principal hope for saving Christian necks is Syria. They sound like Assad is the latest incarnation of the Crusaders."

Christian denominations among Lebanese people

Maronite Catholic 

The Maronite Christians in Lebanon is the largest Christian denomination among the Lebanese people, representing 21% of the Lebanese population.

The Maronite Church's full communion with the Catholic Church was reaffirmed in 1182, after hundreds of years of isolation in Mount Lebanon. By the terms of union, they retain their rites and canon law and use Arabic and Aramaic in their liturgy as well the Karshuni script with old Syriac letters. Their origins are uncertain. One version traces them to John Maron of Antioch in the seventh century A.D.; another points to St. Maron, a monk in the late fourth and early fifth centuries (who is considered by many to be the true origin of the Maronite Church). The words "maron" or "marun" in Syriac mean "small lord."

In the late seventh century, as a result of persecutions from other Christians for the heterodox views they had adopted, the Maronites withdrew from the coastal regions into the mountainous areas of Lebanon and Syria. During the Ottoman era (1516–1914) they remained isolated and relatively independent in these areas. In 1857 and 1858 the Maronites revolted against the large landowning families. The revolt was followed by a further struggle between the Druzes and Maronites over land ownership, political power, and safe passage of community members in the territory of the other. The conflict led France to send a military expedition to the area in 1860. The disagreements diminished in intensity only after the establishment of the Mandate and a political formula whereby all denominations achieved a degree of political representation.
The Maronite rite has been directed and administered by the Patriarch of Antioch and the East. Bishops are generally nominated by a church synod from among the graduates of the Maronite College in Rome. In 1987, Mar Nasrallah Butrus Sufayr (also spelled Sfeir) was the Maronite Patriarch.

Besides the Beirut archdiocese, nine other archdioceses and dioceses are in the Middle East: Aleppo, Damascus, Jubayl-Al Batrun, Cyprus, Baalbek, Tripoli, Tyre, Sidon, and Cairo. Parishes and independent dioceses are situated in Argentina, Brazil, Venezuela, the United States, Canada, Mexico, Côte d'Ivoire, and Senegal. There are four minor seminaries in Lebanon (Al Batrun, Ghazir, Ayn Saadah, and Trablous) and a faculty of theology at the University of the Holy Spirit at Al Kaslik, which is run by the Maronite Monastic Order. The patriarch is elected in a secret ceremony by a synod of bishops and confirmed by the Pope.

Leaders of the Rite have considered Maronite Christianity as the "foundation of the Lebanese nation". The Maronites have been closely associated with the political system of independent Lebanon; it was estimated that in pre-Civil War Lebanon members of this Rite held a large portion of the leading posts. However roles were shifted due to the Taif Agreement's theoretical balancing of power.

Eastern Orthodox 

Eastern Orthodox Christianity in Lebanon is the second largest Christian denomination among the Lebanese people, representing 8% of the Lebanese population.

The Greek Orthodox Church of Antioch adheres to the Eastern Orthodox Church, which is actually a group of autocephalous churches using the Byzantine rite and are the second largest Christian denomination within Christianity in Lebanon. Historically, these churches grew out of the four Eastern Patriarchates (Jerusalem, Antioch, Alexandria, and Constantinople) of the original five major episcopal sees (the Pentarchy) of the Roman Empire which included Rome. The final split took place in 1054. From that time, the Eastern Churches have continued to reject the claims of the Patriarchate of Rome (the Catholic Church) to universal supremacy and have rejected the concept of papal infallibility. Doctrinally, the main point at issue between the Eastern and Western Churches is that of the procession of the Holy Spirit and there are also divergences in ritual and discipline.

The Eastern Orthodox Christians include many free-holders, and the community is less dominated by large landowners than other Christian denominations. In present-day Lebanon, the Eastern Orthodox Christians have become increasingly urbanized, and form a major part of the commercial and professional class of Beirut and other cities. Many are found in the Southeast (Nabatieh/Beqaa) and North, near Tripoli. They are highly educated and well-versed in finance. The church has often served as a bridge between Lebanese Christians and the Arab countries, because it exists in various parts of the Arab world. Members of the rite constitute 8% of the population.

Melkite Catholic 

The Melkite Christianity in Lebanon is the third largest Christian denomination among the Lebanese people, representing 5% of the Lebanese population.

The Melkite Catholics emerged as a distinct group from 1724 when they split from the Greek Orthodox Church over a disputed election of the Patriarch of Antioch. The elected man was considered too 'pro-Roman' and another faction, the larger, elected a rival who was supported by the Orthodox patriarch in Constantinople (the see of Antioch had ignored the split between the two which occurred in 1054 and was canonically in union with both in 1724). Although they fully accept Catholic doctrines as defined by the Holy See, they have generally remained close to the Greek Orthodox Church, retaining more of the ancient rituals and customs than have the Maronites. They employ Arabic and Greek and follow the Byzantine rite.

The highest official of the church since 1930 has been the Patriarch of Antioch, who resides at Ayn Traz, about twenty-four kilometers southeast of Beirut. The patriarch is elected by bishops in a synod and confirmed by the Pope in Rome, who sends him a pallium (a circular band of white wool worn by archbishops) in recognition of their communion. Greek Catholic churches, like those of the Greek Orthodox, contain icons but no statues.
The Melkite Greek Catholics live primarily in the central and eastern parts of the country, dispersed in many villages. Members of this rite are concentrated in Beirut, Zahlah, and the suburbs of Sidon. They have a relatively higher level of education than other denominations. Proud of their Arab heritage, Greek Catholics have been able to strike a balance between their openness to the Arab world and their identification with the West. Greek Catholics are estimated to constitute 5% of the population.

Protestantism

The Protestant Christianity in Lebanon is the fourth largest Christian denomination among the Lebanese people, representing 1% of the Lebanese population.

Most Protestants in Lebanon were converted by missionaries, primarily English and American, during the nineteenth and twentieth centuries. They are divided into a number of denominations, including Presbyterian, Congregational, and Anglican. They are perceived by some to number disproportionately highly among the professional middle class. They constitute nearly 1 percent of the population (around 40,000) and live primarily in Beirut (Greater Beirut).

Baptist
The Lebanese Baptist Evangelical Convention was founded in 1955 by various churches.

Christian denominations among ethnic minorities

Armenian Orthodox or Apostolic

The Armenians in Lebanon were refugees who had fled Turkey during and after World War I and the Armenian genocide.

The Apostolic Church was organized in the third century and became autocephalous as a national church in the fourth century. In the sixth century it modified the formulations of the Council of Chalcedon of 451 that confirmed the dual nature of Christ in one person. Instead the Apostolic Church adopted a form of Miaphysitism that believes in the united nature of divine and human in Christ, a belief shared by the Copts and the Syrian Orthodox Church (Oriental Orthodox Church). The Armenian Orthodox Church has two catholicoi (Sis and Etchmiadzin Cathedral) and two patriarchs (Constantinople and Jerusalem).

The Armenians in Lebanon reside mostly in Beirut and its northern suburbs as well as in Anjar. During the civil war the main stance of the Armenians was not to pick a side between Muslims or Christians and stay exempt mostly from the fighting. The largest Armenian community in Lebanon is found in Bourj Hammoud.

Armenian Catholic Church 

Among the Armenians in Lebanon there are some who belong to the Armenian Catholic Church. They are also refugees who had fled Turkey during and after World War I and the Armenian genocide.

Latin Catholic Church 

The Latin Catholic Church in Lebanon consists mainly of small group of Latin Catholics who are of at least partial French or Italian descent.

Assyrian Church of the East 

The Assyrians in Lebanon were refugees who had fled their native lands in southeastern Turkey during and after World War I due to the Assyrian genocide. Even today refugees continue to flee from northern Iraq into Syria, Lebanon or Jordan due to continuous unrest in Iraq.

The Archdiocese of Lebanon and Syria of the Assyrian Church of the East is based in the Mar Gewargis Church of Sad El Bouchrieh, Beirut, Lebanon. After the recent passing of the archdiocese's late Archbishop Mar Narsai D'Baz, Archbishop Mar Meelis Zaia of Australia and New Zealand temporarily took over the archdiocese, handling all church related issues in Lebanon. The current bishops, the Bishop of Europe and the Bishop of Syria, oversee their individual dioceses until a new Metropolitan is appointed.

Syriac Catholic Church 

The members of the Syriac Catholic Church are also refugees who had fled southeastern Turkey (present day Mardin region) during and after World War I and the Assyrian/Syriac genocide. Even today refugees continue to flee from northern Iraq and northeastern Syria into Lebanon or Jordan due to continuous unrest in Iraq and Syria.

The Syriac Catholic Eparchy of Beirut is the proper archeparchy (Eastern Catholic (archdiocese) of the Syriac Catholic Church's (Antiochian Rite in Syriac language) Patriarch of Antioch in his actual seat, Beirut, Lebanon.

Syriac Orthodox Church 

The members of the Syriac Orthodox Church are also refugees who had fled southeastern Turkey (present day Mardin region) during and after World War I and the Assyrian/Syriac genocide. Even today refugees continue to flee from northern Iraq and northeastern Syria into Lebanon or Jordan due to continuous unrest in Iraq and Syria.

There are several archdioceses and dioceses of the Syriac Orthodox Church on the territory of Lebanon. The church follows the Syriac liturgy of St. James and has an independent hierarchy under the Syriac Orthodox Patriarch of Antioch, whose seat was formerly at Mardin in Turkey and is now at Damascus, Syria.

Chaldean Catholic Church 

The members of the Chaldean Catholic Church are also refugees who had fled southeastern Turkey (present day Mardin region) during and after World War I and the Assyrian/Syriac genocide. Even today refugees continue to flee from northern Iraq and northeastern Syria into Lebanon or Jordan due to continuous unrest in Iraq and Syria.

The Chaldean Catholic Eparchy of Beirut is the sole eparchy (Eastern Catholic diocese) of the Chaldean Catholic Church and is immediately dependent on the Chaldean Catholic Patriarch of Babylon in Baghdad, Iraq.

Coptic Orthodox Church 

The Copts in Lebanon were immigrants/refugees who had fled their native lands in Egypt, Libya and Sudan.

According to tradition, the Coptic Orthodox Church of Alexandria was established by Saint Mark, an apostle and evangelist, in the middle of the 1st century (approximately AD 42). The ethnic Copts in Lebanon are estimated to be 3,000 – 4,000 and the Coptic Orthodox Church is one of the 18 religious sects recognized by the Lebanese Constitution.

See also
 List of cathedrals in Lebanon
 Lebanese people (Maronite Christians)
 Lebanese people (Eastern Orthodox Christians)
 Lebanese people (Melkite Christians)
 Lebanese people (Protestant Christians)
 Christianity in the Middle East
 Secularism in Lebanon
 Religion in Lebanon
 Islam in Lebanon

Notes

References